Kristin Wieczorek (born 2 May 1986) is a German former figure skater. She is the 2007 German national champion and qualified for the free skate at the 2007 European Championships.

Career 
Kristin Wieczorek began skating at the age of five in Erfurt, coached by Ilona Schindler. Later, she represented the USG Chemnitz club and was coached for some time by Anett Pötzsch. 

In 2007, Wieczorek won the German senior national title. She was assigned to the 2007 European Championships, where she placed 19th, and the 2007 World Championships, where she finished 29th. Michael Huth became her coach in the summer of 2007. 

In 2008, Wieczorek finished fourth at the German Championships. She ended her competitive career in 2009 and began working as a physiotherapist at a soccer club, SV Stahl Thale.

Personal life 
Kristin Wieczorek's younger brother Denis has also competed internationally in figure skating.

Programs

Competitive highlights

References

External links 

 
 http://www.stahl-thale.com/

German female single skaters
Living people
1986 births
Sportspeople from Erfurt